A. Sujanapal (February 1, 1949 - June 23, 2011) was an advocate, social worker and Indian National Congress politician from  Kerala, India. He represented Kozhikode North Assembly constituency in 9th and 11th Kerala Legislative Assembly. He was the Minister of Forests and Environment in the Kerala Cabinet in first Oommen Chandy ministry. He wrote several books including travelogues.

Biography 
A. Sujanapal was born on February 1, 1949, at Kozhikode, the son of freedom fighter A. Balagopalan and social activist Anandalakshmi. He was graduated from Zamorin's Guruvayoorappan College, Kozhikode and obtained his law degree from the Government Law College, Kozhikode.

Personal life and death
Sujanapal and his wife Jayasree have two children. He died on June 23, 2011, due to complications of cancer, at a private hospital in Kozhikode.

Political career 
Sujanapal was active in politics from his school times. He entered politics through Kerala Students Union (KSU).

In addition to being the KPCC Treasurer and general secretary, Kozhikode District Congress Committee president and general secretary, president, of Kozhikode district Youth Congress Committee, he has also served as a syndicate member of University of Calicut and secretary of Friends of Soviet Union.

Sujanapal represented Kozhikode North Assembly constituency in 9th and 11th Kerala Legislative Assembly and was the Minister of Forests and Environment in the Kerala Cabinet in first Oommen Chandy ministry, from January 4, 2006. During the period 2001–2005, he also served as the chairman of Committee on Private Members' Bills and Resolutions. He also served as the chairman of Kerala Legislative Assembly Library Committee. He has also contested in the Lok Sabha elections twice.

Sujanapal was also active in the cultural sphere of Kozhikode and was also the chief organizer of many such associations.

Books written 
 
 
 
 
 
 
 
  Travelogue.
 Moonnam Lokam

Legacy
In memory of him, the A. Sujanapal Memorial Educational and Cultural Center is giving Sujanapal Award since 2021. First award was given to Ramesh Chennithala.

References 

1949 births
2011 deaths
Malayali politicians
Indian National Congress politicians from Kerala
Kerala MLAs 1991–1996
Kerala MLAs 2001–2006
Malayalam-language writers
People from Kozhikode district